Hands was an Irish television documentary series broadcast by RTÉ between 1978 and 1989, covering traditional Irish crafts.

Production
Creator David Shaw-Smith began with Telefís Éireann in the 1960s, working as a cameraman with Gerrit van Gelderen and became an independent filmmaker in the early 1970s. he and his wife Sally, an illustrator, travelled Ireland in a VW van recording traditional craftsmen.

Episode list

Legacy

Hands has been described as one "Ireland’s favourite" television programs, and has been rebroadcast several times to the extent that it is one of the "most broadcast" RTÉ productions.

Harvey O'Brien, in his The Real Ireland: The Evolution of Ireland in Documentary Film (2004), said "The series was marked by its close-up observation of the techniques involved, and though lacking an explicit social commentary always gave the sense that these skills were gradually disappearing.".

For over 20 years, the original film sat in tea chests in a barn in Creagh, County Mayo. In March 2013 archivists packed all 1,800 film cans into storage containers and brought them to the RTÉ Archives.

In 2015, it was revisited in the series In Good Hands (TV series).

From Christmas 2021 all programmes online at RTE Player to celebrate 60 Years of television.

References

External links 
Official website
Official YouTube channel

Irish documentary television series
1970s documentary television series
1980s documentary television series
Documentary television series about art
Gaelic games on television
Irish history television shows
English-language television shows
1970s Irish television series
1980s Irish television series
RTÉ original programming
1978 Irish television series debuts
1989 Irish television series endings